The 2005–06 European Challenge Trophy was inaugural edition of the International Challenge Trophy. It was contested by just four teams - England C, Netherlands Amateurs, Belgium U-21 and Italy Lega Pro U-21. Each team played each other once. England C won the competition after winning all three of their games.

Matches

Final Table

Statistics

Top goalscorers

2 goals
  Andy Bishop
  Craig Mackail-Smith

References

Challenge Trophy
International Challenge Trophy